National Route 507 is a national highway of Japan connecting Itoman and Naha on the island of Okinawa, with a total length of 26.5 km (16.46 mi).

References

507
Roads in Okinawa Prefecture